Ernest Stanley Gowenlock (1890–1918), was a  rugby league footballer in the New South Wales Rugby League - the major rugby league competition in Australia.

Ernie Gowenlock played for the Eastern Suburbs club in 1913, that season Easts' won the premiership - their third. A winger, Gowenlock is recognised as the 'Tricolours' 68th player.

War service

Gowenlock joined World War I with the 57th Battalion in France and died of wounds inflicted at Gueudecourt on 10 April 1918 aged 28.

References

The Encyclopedia Of Rugby League; Alan Whiticker & Glen Hudson

Australian rugby league players
Sydney Roosters players
1918 deaths
Australian military personnel killed in World War I
1890 births
Place of birth missing